Dakhrabad (also Romanized as Dakhrābād, Dakharābād, and Dakherābād) is a village in Jabal Rural District, Kuhpayeh District, Isfahan County, Isfahan Province, Iran. At the 2006 census, its population was 99, in 48 families.

References 

Populated places in Isfahan County